Gökçek is a Turkish word and may refer to:

Given name
 Gökçek Vederson (born Wederson Luiz da Silva Medeiros in 1981),  Brazilian-Turkish footballer

Surname
 Dilan Deniz Gökçek, Turkish female football referee
 Hakan Gökçek (born 1993), Austria n footballer of Turkish descent
 Kadriye Gökçek, Turkish female retired football referee
 Melih Gökçek (1948), Turkish politician and mayor of Ankara, Turkey

Places
 Gökçek, Evciler, a village in the district of Evciler, Afyonkarahisar Province, Turkey
 Gökçek Park, a public park in Ankara, Turkey

Turkish given names
Turkish-language surnames